The men's keirin competition at the 2006 Asian Games was held on 14 December at the Aspire Hall 1.

Schedule
All times are Arabia Standard Time (UTC+03:00)

Results
Legend
DNF — Did not finish
DNS — Did not start
REL — Relegated

First round

Heat 1

Heat 2

Heat 3

First round repechages

Heat 1

Heat 2

Second round

Heat 1

Heat 2

Finals

Final B

Final A

Final standing

References

External links 
Results

Track Men keirin